The human spirit is a component of human philosophy, psychology, art, and knowledge; it is the spiritual, or mental, part of humanity. While the term can be used with the same meaning as "human soul", the human spirit is sometimes used to refer to the impersonal, universal, or higher component of human nature in contrast to soul or psyche which can refer to the ego or lower element. The human spirit includes our intellect, emotions, fears, passions, and creativity.

In the models of Daniel A. Helminiak and Bernard Lonergan, human spirit is considered to be the mental functions of awareness, insight, understanding, judgement and other reasoning powers.  It is distinguished from the separate component of psyche which comprises the entities of emotion, images, memory and personality.

Olaf Stapledon defined the human spirit as consisting of love, intelligence and creative action. 

John Teske views human spirit as a social construct representing the qualities of purpose and meaning which transcend the individual human.

Distinction from the soul
According to  historian Oswald Spengler, a distinction between spirit and soul has been made by the West and earlier civilizations which influenced its development.
The human spirit can be seen as the heavenly component of human's non material makeup -  the part that is impersonal or universal.  Whereas souls are the personal element unique to each individual.  As Spengler writes in The Decline of the West:

Some Christians believe that the Bible identifies humanity's three basic elements: spirit, soul, and body. They emphasise  that the human spirit is the 'real person', the very core of a person's being, the essential seat of their existence. They believe that, when a person accepts Jesus Christ as their Saviour, it is their human spirit that is transformed as they become 'new creatures' in Jesus Christ. The soul which is the seat of the will, mind, and emotions does not get converted but needs to be renewed on a daily basis through the recommended Christian disciplines such as prayer and reading the Bible. In Islam, Muslims are viewed as having their own spirits, but one that in a sense is one with God's spirit. For Spengler, the perception of unity this idea led to was important for the emergence of the "consensus" that maintained harmony in Islamic culture, especially during the Golden Age of Islam.

Bibliography

References

Concepts in metaphysics
Emotion
Humanism
Mental content
Personality
Philosophy of life
Social concepts
Spirituality